Merton and Morden may refer to several places:

 Merton and Morden Urban District
 Merton and Morden (UK Parliament constituency)